Kurt Sines is a singer known as "Yoste"  based in Brisbane, Australia, who has composed and recorded several songs, as well as a new album.

Yoste has filmed music videos and posted them on YouTube. One music video, for the song "Chihiro," got over two million views on YouTube.

See also
 Pop music

References

External links
 Official website

Australian singer-songwriters
Queensland musical groups
People from Brisbane
Living people
Australian pop singers
Year of birth missing (living people)